Masaka Secondary School is a mixed, day and boarding middle and high school, located in Masaka District, in Central Uganda.And also its a Muslim school which teaches Arabic though it also welcomes non Muslims

Location
The campus is located to the immediate southwest of the central business district of Masaka. It is bordered by Nakongolero Road to the west, by Yellow Knife Street to the north, by Bwala Hill Road to the east. Hill Road Primary School lie to the south of Masaka Secondary School. The coordinates of the school campus are:0°21'04.0"S, 31°44'15.0"E(Latitude:-0.351111; Longitude:31.737500).

Overview
''Masaka Secondary School is a public middle and high school, administered by the Uganda Ministry of Education & Sports. With a student population in excess of 4000 in 2016, the school is one of the largest secondary schools in the country and east Africa.

History
The school was founded in 1954. It is a member of the Uganda Muslim Education Association (UMEA) an umbrella body that brings together all Muslim founded schools. The first headteacher of the School was Mr. Stephen Kerr, it has had a number of prominent headteachers in the country including Ali Ssendagire and Lubega Waggwa. In 2012, it received a grant of US$2 million (UGX:5 billion), from the African Development Bank, in collaboration with the Uganda Government, to construct new classrooms, a computer center, a library and new science laboratories.

Notable alumni
Notable alumni of Masaka Secondary School include the following:
 Abed Bwanika - Politician, twice former presidential candidate and President of the People's Development Party.
 David Tinyefunza - Former Director of National Intelligence in Uganda
 Hussien Kyanjo - Member of Parliament for Makindye West
 Mathias Mpuuga - Former Youth Minister in  Buganda Government and member of parliament for Masaka Municipal Council
 Ibrahim Ssemujju Nganda - Member of Parliament for Kyadondo East
 Yusuf Nsubuga, Commissioner for Secondary Education, Uganda Ministry of Education.

See also
 Education in Uganda
 List of schools in Uganda

References

External links
"New headmaster lifts up Masaka SS "

Mixed schools in Uganda
Educational institutions established in 1954
Masaka District
1954 establishments in Uganda